Detective Branch is a specialized unit of Bangladesh Police. According to Human Rights Watch, there is extensive documentation of human rights violation by Detective Branch and Rapid Action Battalion. According to Human Rights Watch, 70 percent of extrajudicial deaths involving the police involved Detective Branch.

History
In 1998, Shamim Reza Rubel,a student of the Independent University, Bangladesh, was arrested by Detective Branch members. He was then tortured and killed in custody.

On 25 March 1999, a body of an informant was recovered from the water tank of Detective Branch headquarters in Minto road in Dhaka. Munshi Atiqur Rahman was made investigation officer of the case and pressed charges against four officers of Detective Branch. The case has been in limbo since then.

Assistant Commissioner of Detective Branch Motiur Rahman led a team that detained and tortured a businessman for the purposes of extortion in 2010.

Detective Branch detained and tortured Rehana Yeasmin Dolly of the women's wing of Bangladesh Nationalist Party from Wari in 2012.

On 1 July 2016 Rabiul Karim, assistant commissioner of the Detective Branch Dhaka died in the July 2016 Dhaka attack trying to storm the restaurant taken over by terrorists. On 12 January 2017, 11 fake members of the branch were arrested in Sabujbagh, Dhaka by the Detective Branch.

In March 2015, 7 Detective Branch members entered a border Village in Tripura, India while chasing a criminal in Comilla near the Bangladesh-India border. They were surrounded by the villagers, while three detective members escaped four were detained by Indian Border Security Force. They were handed over to Border Guards Bangladesh and BSF asked that the DB men be charged under Bangladeshi laws.

Superintendent of Police, Harun-ur-Rashid, ordered the withdrawal of three officers of Detective Branch after they had assaulted a nurse on duty at Shaheed Tajuddin Ahmed Medical College Hospital. An inspector of Detective Branch, Bahauddin Faruqui, was injured after being attacked with machetes while leading a raid in Dhaka. Mahbub Sarkar, Sub-inspector of Detective Branch was shot in April 2016 during a police raid in Tatibazar, Dhaka. Detective Branch arrested six in Khulna with tiger skins.

Detective Branch detained four Nigerians on fraud and human trafficking charges. Seven members of Detective Branch were detained in October 2017 with ransom money after they had kidnaped a businessman in Tekhnaf at a Bangladesh Army check post. In September 2022, those officers were sentenced to seven years imprisonment.

Inspector Md Jalal Uddin of Detective Branch was killed in a shootout with criminals in Mirpur while on a joint raid with Mirpur Police Station in March 2018. Sub-inspector Bashir Uddin of Detective Branch alleged that his former commanding officer Inspector Monirul Islam, and Sub-inspector Kamal Hossain had stolen drugs from a raid and made 800 thousand taka selling it. He and Cox's Bazar Officer-in-Charge alleged they were threatened by the duo.

A sub-inspector of Detective Branch, Syed Md Rashedul Alam, was detained for a robbery in Dhaka in December 2019. Detective Branch officials detained and tortured Mohammad Abdul Kaium, a journalist, in Mymensingh. 

In August 2021, six members of Detective Branch were detained for robbing a gold businessman of 20 gold bar worth 12.4 million taka.

Harun-ur-Rashid, a controversial policeman, was appointed head of Detective Branch on 13 July 2022.

In September 2022, members of Detective Branch members of Dhaka District north tortured several members of a Hindu family, including a 14 year old, in Dhamrai when to went to file a robbery case at the police station. They identified the torturers as Inspector Yasin Munshi, Inspector Kamal Hossain, Inspector Kamal Hossain and two unidentified officers. Inspector Yasin Munshi had been involved in a 2011 extrajudicial police killing of a college student, Kazi Imtiaz Hossain Abir.

Notable cases
Detective Branch investigated the Murder of Shazneen Tasnim Rahman.
The branch was given the investigation of the Murder of Avijit Roy.
The branch was given the task to investigate the Murder of Sagar Sarowar and Meherun Runi, after Bangladesh Police failed to solve. The case was transferred to Rapid Action Battalion after Detective Branch expressed inability to solve the Crime.

References

Bangladesh Police
Police units of Bangladesh
Bangladeshi intelligence agencies
Domestic intelligence agencies